Mercato San Severino railway station is the main railway station of the comune of Mercato San Severino, in Campania, Italy. Mercato San Severino is situated in Faraldo-Nocelleto, close to Sant'Antonio.

References

External links

Railway stations in Campania
Buildings and structures in the Province of Salerno